The 2018 Suzuka 10 Hours was endurance event that took place on August 26, 2018 at the Suzuka Circuit in Suzuka City, Japan. It was the 47th edition of the Summer Endurance Classic at Suzuka, and the first as part of the Intercontinental GT Challenge, running under the ten-hour format (the race having previously been a 1000-kilometer format). The race was won by the GruppeM Racing team with Maro Engel, Raffaele Marciello and Tristan Vautier driving.

Due to regulation change, GT300 cars were still eligible to race in Suzuka 10 Hours, while GT500 cars were banned.

Classification

Notes

References

Suzuka 10 Hours
Suzuka
Suzuka